Mahabir Singh (born 1 September 1964) is an Indian wrestler. He competed at the 1980 Summer Olympics and the 1984 Summer Olympics.

References

1964 births
Living people
Indian male sport wrestlers
Olympic wrestlers of India
Wrestlers at the 1980 Summer Olympics
Wrestlers at the 1984 Summer Olympics
Place of birth missing (living people)
Commonwealth Games gold medallists for India
Commonwealth Games medallists in wrestling
Recipients of the Arjuna Award
Wrestlers at the 1982 Commonwealth Games
Medallists at the 1982 Commonwealth Games